1569 Evita, provisional designation , is a dark background asteroid from the outer regions of the asteroid belt, approximately 36 kilometers in diameter. It was discovered on 3 August 1948, by astronomer Miguel Itzigsohn at the La Plata Astronomical Observatory in Argentina. The asteroid was named after Eva Perón.

Orbit and classification 

Based on the hierarchical clustering method, Evita is a non-family asteroid of the main belt's background population. It orbits the Sun in the outer main-belt at a distance of 2.7–3.6 AU once every 5 years and 7 months (2,039 days). Its orbit has an eccentricity of 0.13 and an inclination of 12° with respect to the ecliptic.

The body's observation arc begins with its official discovery observation at La Plata.

Physical characteristics

Diameter and albedo 

According to the survey carried out by the NEOWISE mission of NASA's Wide-field Infrared Survey Explorer, Evita measures 36.346 kilometers in diameter and its surface has an albedo of 0.047. An albedo near 0.05 is typical for carbonaceous C-type asteroids which dominate the outer asteroid belt. It has an absolute magnitude of 11.2.

Rotation period 

As of 2017, no rotational lightcurve of Evita has been obtained from photometric observations. The asteroid's rotation period and axis, as well as its shape remain unknown.

Naming 

This minor planet was named in after the First Lady of Argentina, Eva Perón (1919–1952), who was commonly known by the affectionate Spanish diminutive form of her name, Evita. She was the wife of President Juan Perón (1895–1974) of Argentina.

The discoverer also named the asteroids 1581 Abanderada, 1582 Martir, 1588 Descamisada and 1589 Fanatica in tribute to Eva Perón. The official  was published by the Minor Planet Center in February 1951.

References

External links 
 Asteroid Lightcurve Database (LCDB), query form (info )
 Dictionary of Minor Planet Names, Google books
 Asteroids and comets rotation curves, CdR – Observatoire de Genève, Raoul Behrend
 Discovery Circumstances: Numbered Minor Planets (1)-(5000) – Minor Planet Center
 
 

001569
Discoveries by Miguel Itzigsohn
Named minor planets
19480803